La Pêche aux poissons rouges is an 1895 French short black-and-white silent documentary film directed and produced by Louis Lumière. It was filmed in Lyon, Rhône, Rhône-Alpes, France. Given its age, this short film is available to freely download from the Internet.

The film formed part of the first commercial presentation of the Lumière Cinématographe on 28 December 1895 at the Salon Indien, Grand Café, 14 Boulevard des Capucines, Paris.

Production
As with all early Lumière movies, this film was made in a 35 mm format with an aspect ratio of 1.33:1. It was filmed by means of the Cinématographe, an all-in-one camera, which also serves as a film projector and developer.

Plot

A man (Auguste Lumiere) holds his baby daughter (Andrée Lumiere) on a table next to a bowl containing goldfish.  The baby begins putting her hand into the water while the man supports her.  The scene is filmed by a stationary camera behind the table.

References

External links
 
 Complete video at The Lumiere Institute (requires QuickTime)
 

1895 films
French black-and-white films
French silent short films
French short documentary films
Films directed by Auguste and Louis Lumière
1890s short documentary films
Black-and-white documentary films
1890s French films